Chrysallida verdensis is a species of sea snail, a marine gastropod mollusk in the family Pyramidellidae, the pyrams and their allies. The species is one of a number within the genus Chrysallida

Distribution
This species occurs in the following locations:
 Cape Verde archipelago

References

External links
 To Encyclopedia of Life
 To World Register of Marine Species

verdensis
Gastropods described in 1998
Gastropods of Cape Verde